Busto Arsizio is a railway station in Italy. Located on the common section of the lines Domodossola–Milan, Luino–Milan and Porto Ceresio–Milan, it serves the city of Busto Arsizio. It is joined by a junction track to the Busto Arsizio Nord railway station, managed by Ferrovienord.

Services
The station is served by the line S5 of the Milan suburban railway network and by the regional lines Milan–Domodossola and Milan–Varese, operated by Trenord and Trenitalia.

It is also served by the line S50 of the Ticino rapid transit network, operated by TILO.

See also
 Milan suburban railway network

External links
 

Railway stations in Lombardy
Railway Station
Milan S Lines stations
Railway stations opened in 1924